Randall is a populated place situated in Montgomery County, New York, United States. It is a hamlet in the northeastern part of the Town of Root on New York State Route 5S.

The area where Randall is now was originally named Yatesville. The name of Randall was adopted in 1863, at the suggestion of the first postmaster.

References

Hamlets in Montgomery County, New York